AltSchool is a San Francisco-based education and technology company founded with one school in 2013, later expanded to additional schools in 2014. As of June, 2019 AltSchool ceased operating schools directly and rebranded as Altitude Learning, a software company.

Founding 
AltSchool's founder and CEO, Max Ventilla, left his previous career at Google in 2013. He wanted to work in education and in 2014 raised $33M of venture capital funding to start AltSchool. The Series A financing was led by Founders Fund and Andreessen Horowitz, with follow-on investment from First Round Capital and Harrison Metal and participation from John Doerr, Jonathan Sackler, Learn Capital, and Omidyar Network.

Series B 
In 2015, AltSchool raised a $100M Series B round of funding. The round was led by Founders Fund and Andreessen Horowitz , with Mark Zuckerberg and Priscilla Chan also participating through their Silicon Valley Community Foundation.

Coddy Johnson, former executive of video game company Activision, joined the company from 2016 to 2017. In 2017, the company hired Devin Vodicka, former Superintendent of Vista Unified School District in California to serve as its Chief Impact Officer. Ben Kornell, former COO of Envision Charter Schools, joined the company as Vice President of Growth.

Schools
The company has created a series of micro schools that focus on personalized learning, where children are involved in setting the projects they work on. Students and teachers create individual "playlists" of tasks and projects for each student. Their progress is streamed to parents using a portal app. By 2016, six schools had been opened in San Francisco, Palo Alto and Brooklyn. In October 2016, Berthold Academy in Reston, the Greene School in West Palm Beach, and Temple Beth Sholom in Miami Beach partnered with AltSchool. In 2017, AltSchool launched a tiny private middle school in New York City's Union Square. In November 2017, Altschool said it would close a school in San Francisco's Palo Alto and a school in New York City's East Village at the end of the academic year.

References 

Internet properties established in 2014
Educational technology companies of the United States
B Lab-certified corporations
Public benefit corporations based in California
Technology companies based in the San Francisco Bay Area